During the 2000–01 season, Red Star Belgrade participated in the 2000–01 First League of FR Yugoslavia, 2000–01 FR Yugoslavia Cup, 2000–01 UEFA Champions League qualifying rounds and 2000–01 UEFA Cup.

Squad

Results

Overview

First League of FR Yugoslavia

FR Yugoslavia Cup

UEFA Champions League

First qualifying round

Second qualifying round

Third qualifying round

UEFA Cup

First round

Second round

Celta were awarded a 3–0 victory for the second leg as Red Star fielded ineligible players, therefore winning 3–1 on aggregate

See also
 List of Red Star Belgrade seasons

References

Red Star Belgrade seasons
Red Star
Serbian football championship-winning seasons